Sneakers, known in Japan as , is a video game published by Microsoft Game Studios and developed by Media.Vision for the Xbox. The North American version of the game was sold exclusively at Toys "R" Us retail stores.

In this game, the player takes on the role of a mouse named Apollo. Aided by his fellow rodent friends, Bonnie, Brutus, Watt and Pete, the player's goal is to find and eliminate the rats in their area (the house, back alley, central park, Doshi's cellar and the bridge) in order to find Bonnie's brother, Tiki.

Plot
The story begins with a quick shot of a small mouse with a bell on his tail- Tiki -climbing up to the top of a small tower. After viewing some fireworks and a few balloons being thrown up in the air, Tiki falls asleep.

Elsewhere, four mice- Apollo (the leader), Brutus (the muscle), Watt (the gentleman) and Pete (the gut) -find that the provisions that had been set aside in the attic for a party have been absconded with. Naturally upset, everyone begins pointing fingers; thankfully, Apollo finds a more likely cause of the theft, as he spies a sneaky rat crawling around up in the attic. Knowing that rats travel in packs, Apollo rallies his fellow mice and begins the hunt for the whole rat pack. Finding the rats one by one (and knocking a few senseless for good measure), the gang eventually find the commanding officer behind the whole rat invasion hiding in the garage and- following an intense battle between the mice gang and rats -knock him out. Despite the victory, the mice still have no clue who these rats are or what they're up to; however, they are quickly stunned out of their wondering as Bonnie- the local high-society city mouse -comes in, worrying about her brother, Tiki, as he has gone missing. Thinking he's lost in the Back Alley, she joins Apollo's squad and rushes off, allowing the rat officer from earlier (who faked his fainting) to run away.

Reception

The game received "unfavorable" reviews according to the review aggregation website Metacritic. In Japan, Famitsu gave it a score of two sixes and two fives for a total of 22 out of 40.

It was nominated for the "Worst Game of the Year on Xbox" award at GameSpots Best and Worst of 2002 Awards, which went to Gravity Games Bike: Street Vert Dirt.

References

External links

2002 video games
Media.Vision games
Microsoft games
Puzzle video games
Video games about mice and rats
Video games developed in Japan
Xbox games
Xbox-only games
Single-player video games